Nicolás González Gutíerrez (born ) is a Chilean male track cyclist, representing Chile at international competitions. He won the bronze medal at the 2016 Pan American Track Cycling Championships in the team pursuit.

References

External links

1997 births
Living people
Chilean male cyclists
Chilean track cyclists
Place of birth missing (living people)
21st-century Chilean people